Parviturbo elegantulus is a species of sea snail, a marine gastropod mollusk in the family Skeneidae.

Description
The size of the shell attains 1.7 mm.

Distribution
This species occurs in the Alboran Sea at depths between 120 m and 160 m.

References

 Philippi R. A., 1844, Enumeratio molluscorum Siciliae cum viventium tum in tellure tertiaria fossilium, quae in itinere suo observavit. Vol. 2; Eduard Anton, Halle [Halis Saxorum] iv + 303 p., pl. 13–28 
 Gofas, S.; Le Renard, J.; Bouchet, P. (2001). Mollusca, in: Costello, M.J. et al. (Ed.) (2001). European register of marine species: a check-list of the marine species in Europe and a bibliography of guides to their identification. Collection Patrimoines Naturels, 50: pp. 180–213

elegantulus